CKDG-FM is a radio station located in Montreal, Quebec, Canada. Owned and operated by Groupe CHCR Inc., it broadcasts on 105.1 MHz using a directional antenna with an average effective radiated power of 524 watts (class A).  Like most FM stations, it broadcasts in stereo. CKDG's studios are located at 4865 Jean Talon Street West - Suite 224, in Montreal. It also identifies itself as MIKE FM.

CKDG-FM broadcasts mainstream multicultural programming. Per its license, CKDG-FM is allowed to air up to 35% of its programming in the English and/or French languages; since May 2006, MIKE FM has broadcast an English-language Morning Drive show program (The Morning Drive) and a mainstream English Drive Home show with classic 1980s hits.

History
The station was previously known as CHCR when it was on closed circuit cable for decades, before moving to full-fledged over the air FM in early 2004. The station received CRTC approval in 2003 to operate a new ethnic FM radio station in Montreal.

References

External links
 105.1 MIKE-FM / CKDG
 
 

KDG
KDG
Greek-Canadian culture
Greek-language radio stations
Radio stations established in 2004
2004 establishments in Quebec